Yannick Anister Sagbo Latte (born 12 April 1988), known as Yannick Sagbo, is a professional footballer who plays as a striker. Born in France, he represented the Ivory Coast at international level.

Club career

Early career
Sagbo was born in Marseille, France, and began his football career playing for his local side in SC Air Bel, in Marseille, before joining Monaco during the winter of 2004. He was a part of Monaco's 07–08 CFA squad that won the reserve's professional title (a championship that is reserve for the professional clubs reserves playing in the CFA) scoring 13 goals in 25 matches. Following the season on 13 May 2008, he signed his first professional contract, agreeing to a three-year deal keeping him at the club until 2011.

He officially joined the first-team squad for pre-season in July 2008, where he was handed the number 9 kit. Sagbo made three appearances during the pre-season, starting them all including their opening friendly match against fellow Ligue 1 side Toulouse FC, Croatian side NK Zagreb, and Olympique Marseille. He proceeded to make his professional debut on 8 November 2008 in a 0–1 loss to Olympique Lyonnais, coming on as a substitute playing 17 minutes.

Hull City
On 26 July 2013, Sagbo signed a two-year contract for an undisclosed fee with English Premier League side Hull City. He made his debut for Hull, on the first day of the 2013–14 season, playing the full 90 minutes in a 2–0 loss away at Chelsea. On 24 August 2013, against Norwich City at the KC Stadium, a confrontation between players saw Sagbo given a straight red card for violent conduct. He scored his first goal in English football on 19 October 2013, away at Everton in a 2–1 defeat, having come on as a substitute. Later in the season, he scored as Hull reached their first-ever FA Cup Final by scoring their first goal in a 5–3 FA Cup semi-final defeat of Sheffield United at Wembley Stadium; he had also scored an equaliser earlier in the competition to prevent their elimination. In the final, which Hull lost to Arsenal, Sagbo was an unused substitute.

At the start of the 2014–15 season, Sagbo featured only once for Hull, in a League Cup exit. Out of contention with the Tigers, he joined Championship side Wolverhampton Wanderers on an emergency loan om September 2014 that was due to last three months and made his club debut on 1 October 2014 in a defeat to Huddersfield Town. However, after three brief substitute appearances, he dropped out of first team contention, with manager Kenny Jackett citing a lack of fitness and the player's failure during his appearances to "state a case for more [gametime]". On 13 November he was recalled by Hull City, two months before his loan was due to expire. Jackett subsequently suggested it had been a mutual decision between the clubs. His contract expired in 2015 and Hull City decided not to extend it.

International career
Sagbo was nominated for the Benin national team on 30 May 2008 against Angola. On 10 August 2010, he made his debut for the Ivory Coast national team against Italy in a friendly game at Upton Park. He came on after 61 minutes for Seydou Doumbia. Ivory Coast won the game 1–0.

Career statistics

Honours
Hull City
FA Cup runner-up: 2013–14

References

External links

 The Official Website of Yannick Sagbo
 LFP Profile
 Profile on AS Monaco Website
 Foot-national Profile
 
 
 

1988 births
Living people
Footballers from Marseille
French footballers
Ivorian footballers
Ivory Coast international footballers
Association football forwards
AS Monaco FC players
Thonon Evian Grand Genève F.C. players
Hull City A.F.C. players
Wolverhampton Wanderers F.C. players
Umm Salal SC players
Al-Shamal SC players
Ligue 1 players
Ligue 2 players
Premier League players
Qatar Stars League players
Qatari Second Division players
French sportspeople of Beninese descent
French sportspeople of Ivorian descent
Black French sportspeople